Something Else from The Move is a live EP by The Move.

It was recorded at London's Marquee Club in 1968, and released later that year. It was re-released as a mini album CD with four bonus tracks in 1999.

The tracks feature vocals which were overdubbed later. This was because the microphones had not functioned properly during the show onto tape, which required the extra work. These were done in a one-take "as live" fashion. According to the Movements boxed set, examination of the master tapes of the complete Marquee Club performance reveals why Something Else consists entirely of cover songs, as well as why it was an EP and not an LP album: all the tracks not included on the original EP album are of noticeably lower sound quality, and the tracks capturing original The Move songs (among them "Fire Brigade" and "Flowers in the Rain") in particular are of such poor quality that they are almost unlistenable.

Track listing
"So You Want to Be a Rock 'n' Roll Star" (Roger McGuinn, Chris Hillman) (originally by The Byrds)
"Stephanie Knows Who" (Arthur Lee) (originally by Love from Da Capo)
"Something Else" (Sharon Sheeley, Bob Cochran) (originally by Eddie Cochran)
"It'll Be Me" (Jack Clement) (originally by Jerry Lee Lewis)
"Sunshine Help Me" (Gary Wright) (originally by Spooky Tooth)

1999 Bonus tracks
"Piece of My Heart" (Jerry Ragovoy, Bert Berns)
"Too Much In Love" (Denny Laine)
"(Your Love Keeps Lifting Me) Higher and Higher" (Gary Jackson, Carl Smith)
"Sunshine Help Me" (Unedited Version) (Gary Wright)

References

1968 debut EPs
The Move albums
1968 live albums
Live EPs
Regal Zonophone Records live albums
Regal Zonophone Records EPs
Live albums recorded at The Marquee Club